Perth Building Society was Western Australia’s first building society. It operated from 1862 to 1987, when it amalgamated with the Hotham Permanent Building Society to form Challenge Bank.

PBS was founded by WA Attorney General George Frederick Stone, Lt. Col. J. Bruce, Adjutant General W. Knight, Rev. G.P. Pownall, Magistrate H. Wakefield and Joseph Thomas Reilly.

It proposed an earlier merger in 1981 with Bendigo Building Society, but Bendigo customers and shareholders opposed the move.

Bryce Moore's history of the Perth Building Society was published in 1989.

References

See also
 Timeline of banking in Western Australia

Former building societies of Australia
Banks established in 1862
Organizations established in 1862
Banks disestablished in 1987
Organisations based in Western Australia